The 1999–2000 Auburn Tigers men's basketball team represented Auburn University in the 1999–2000 college basketball season. The team's head coach was Cliff Ellis, who was in his sixth season at Auburn. The team played their home games at Beard–Eaves–Memorial Coliseum in Auburn, Alabama. They finished the season 24–10, 9–7 in SEC play. They defeated Florida and South Carolina to advance to the SEC tournament championship game where they lost to Arkansas. They received an at-large bid to the NCAA tournament where they defeated Creighton to advance to the Second Round where they lost to Iowa State.

The Tigers began the season with high hopes, being ranked #4 in the Associated Press pre-season polls.  They stayed in the Top 10 for most of the season until, after Auburn's 68-64 loss on February 22, 2000 to Alabama, it was discovered star forward Chris Porter had accepted money from an agent.  Porter was suspended for the remainder of the regular season, the SEC tournament, and the NCAA tournament.

Previous season
The Tigers finished the 1998–99 season 29–4, 14–2 in SEC play to win the SEC regular season championship. As the top seed out of the West division in the SEC tournament, the Tigers defeated Alabama to advance to the semifinals of the SEC tournament where they lost to Kentucky. They received an at-large bid to the NCAA tournament as a 1 seed for the first time in program history. They defeated Winthrop and Oklahoma State to advance to the program's first Sweet Sixteen since 1986, where they lost to Ohio State.

Roster

Schedule and results

|-
!colspan=9 style="background:#172240; color:white;"| Exhibition

|-
!colspan=9 style="background:#172240; color:white;"| Regular season

|-
!colspan=9 style="background:#172240; color:white;" | SEC tournament

|-
!colspan=9 style="background:#172240; color:white;" | NCAA tournament

Rankings

References

Auburn Tigers men's basketball seasons
Auburn
Auburn
Auburn
Auburn